Joseph-Aignan Sigaud de Lafond (5 January 1730, Bourges – 26 January 1810, Bourges) was a French obstetrician.

While pursuing a medical career as an obstetrician, he was one of the most faithful attendants of the lectures by the abbot Jean-Antoine Nollet (1700–1770), whom he succeeded, in 1760, in the chair of experimental physics at the Collège Louis le Grand in Paris. In 1795, he became a professor of physics and chemistry at the École Centrale. His treatise Description et usage d'un cabinet de physique (Paris, 1775) is a compendium of the experimental physics of his time. He was a student of Jean Antoine Nollet.

References

Pyenson, Lewis, and Jean-François Gauvin. The art of teaching physics: the eighteenth-century demonstration apparatus of Jean Antoine Nollet. Les éditions du Septentrion, 2002.

Works

External links

1730 births
1810 deaths
French scientific instrument makers
French obstetricians
People from Bourges